Behind a Long Wall (Spanish: Detrás de un largo muro) is a 1958 Argentine drama film directed by Lucas Demare and starring Susana Campos, Gloria Ferrandiz and Ricardo Argemí. A rural family emigrate to Buenos Aires but are disillusioned with life in the city's poor suburbs.

Cast
 Susana Campos as Rosita  
 Gloria Ferrandiz
 Ricardo Argemí
 Francisco Audenino 
 Alberto Barcel 
 Cayetano Biondo 
 Warly Ceriani 
 Yamandú Di Paula 
 Rafael Diserio 
 Rolando Dumas 
 Domingo Garibotto as Viejo en bomba de agua 
 Olga Madero 
 Rita Montesi 
 Inés Moreno 
 Lautaro Murúa 
 María Nieves
 Marisa Núñez 
 Luis Orbegozo as Hombre en bomba de agua  
 Jorge Palaz 
 Mario Passano
 Félix Rivero
 Jorge Villalba as Amigo de Pedro

References

Bibliography 
 Michael Pigott & Santiago Oyarzabel. World Film Locations: Buenos Aires. Intellect Ltd, 2014.

External links 
 

1958 films
Argentine drama films
1958 drama films
1950s Spanish-language films
Films directed by Lucas Demare
Films set in Buenos Aires
Films shot in Buenos Aires
1950s Argentine films